Lipotriches fulvinerva is a species of bee in the genus Lipotriches, of the family Halictidae.

References

Halictidae
Insects described in 1907